U.S. Route 183 (US-183) is a part of the U.S. Highway System that runs from US-77 in Refugio, Texas north to Interstate 90 (I-90) in Presho, South Dakota. In the U.S. state of Kansas, US-183 is a main north–south highway that runs from the Oklahoma border north to the Nebraska border.

Between 1930 and 1931, US-183 was extended south into Kansas to US-83 in Dresden. Then between July 1938 and 1939, US-183 was altered to follow US-36 east to K-1 in Phillipsburg, then south along K-1 to US-160. Then continued west along US-160 to K-34 in Sitka, which it followed south from Sitka to the Oklahoma border. Between 1941 and 1944, US-183 and US-83 were swapped within Nebraska and a small portion into Kansas, which straightened their alignment and eliminated the overlap between the two in Norton. The former alignment of US-83 from northeast of Selden to east of Woodruff became US-383, now K-383.

Route description

US-183 enters Kansas in Clark County and turns east at Sitka, where it overlaps US-160, entering Comanche County, where it passes through Protection. The highways stay paired as it turns north to pass through the Comanche County seat, Coldwater. At Coldwater, US-160 turns back to the east, and US-183 continues its northerly track.

Entering Kiowa County, US-183 reaches a junction with US-54 and US-400, where it passes through Greensburg. In southern Edwards County, the highway makes a brief turn to the west before meeting up with US-56 in Kinsley, the Edwards County seat. US-56 and US-183 turn northeast before the highways split after entering Pawnee County. US-56 continues northeast toward Larned, and US-183 straightens out to pass through largely unpopulated areas in Edwards County.

In Rush County, US-183 intersects two primary east–west Kansas state highways, K-96 in Rush Center and K-4 in LaCrosse.

US-183 reaches the largest city along its route in Kansas, Hays, where a western bypass of the highway provides direct access to Gross Memorial Coliseum and Fort Hays State University. US-183 is known as Vine Street in Hays and contains numerous businesses. US-183 runs through town for three miles (5 km) before crossing Interstate 70, which is heavily traveled in Hays with traffic between Denver and Kansas City. The interchange of US-183 and I-70 has been designated as the CW2 Bryan J. Nichols Fallen Veterans Memorial Interchange.

At Plainville, US-183 has a junction with K-18.

US-183 meets US-36 west, and the highways join for a concurrency through the city of Phillipsburg. The highways split in downtown Phillipsburg, and US-183 has one last junction with K-383 before exiting the state south of Alma, Nebraska.

US-183 is two-laned throughout Kansas, except for the portion which runs through Hays.

History
Between 1930 and 1931, US-183 was extended south into Kansas, across US-36, to US-83 in Dresden. Between July 1938 and 1939, US-183 was altered to follow US-36 east to K-1 in Phillipsburg, then south along K-1 to US-160. It then continued west along US-160 to K-34 in Sitka, which it followed south from Sitka to the Oklahoma border. Between 1941 and 1944, US-183 and US-83 were swapped within Nebraska and a small portion into Kansas, which straightened their alignment and eliminated the overlap between the two in Norton. The former alignment of US-83 from northeast of Selden to east of Woodruff became US-383, now K-383.

Major intersections

Bypass

U.S. Route 183 Bypass (US-183 Bypass) is a bypass route in Hays. It begins at US-183 and runs north and ends at I-70 and US-40.

References

External links

Kansas Department of Transportation State Map
KDOT: Historic State Maps

83-1
Transportation in Clark County, Kansas
Transportation in Comanche County, Kansas
Transportation in Kiowa County, Kansas
Transportation in Edwards County, Kansas
Transportation in Pawnee County, Kansas
Transportation in Rush County, Kansas
Transportation in Ellis County, Kansas
Transportation in Rooks County, Kansas
Transportation in Phillips County, Kansas
 Kansas